The White is an EP by American metal band Agalloch, released on February 29, 2008. A follow-up to Agalloch's 2004 EP The Grey, it completed a dichotomy of releases for Vendlus Records. The White contained seven neofolk and dark ambient tracks written and recorded between 2004 and 2007. The release was limited to 2000 copies.

The song "Sowilo Rune" (referencing the Sowilo rune) was posted on the band's official Myspace page on January 4. The songs "The Isle of Summer," "Summerisle Reprise," and "Sowilo Rune" contained samples from the 1973 film The Wicker Man. "Birch White" featured vocalist John Haughm reciting the poem "Birch Tree" by A. S. J. Tessimond.

Track listing

References

2008 EPs
Agalloch albums